East Gloucestershire Cricket Club Ground was a cricket ground in Cheltenham, Gloucestershire. The first recorded match on the ground was in 1883, when East Gloucestershire played Worcestershire.

In 1888, Gloucestershire played Nottinghamshire in the grounds first first-class match. The second and final first-class match held on the ground came in 1903 when Gloucestershire played the Gentlemen of Philadelphia.

No longer used for cricket, today the site of the ground is by the East Gloucestershire Tennis Club.

References

External links
East Gloucestershire Cricket Club Ground on CricketArchive
East Gloucestershire Cricket Club Ground on Cricinfo

Defunct cricket grounds in England
Cricket grounds in Gloucestershire
Sports venues in Cheltenham
Tennis venues in England
Sports venues completed in 1883